Stuart Louis Shapiro (born December 6, 1947 in New Haven, Connecticut) is an American theoretical astrophysicist, who works on numerical relativity with applications in astrophysics, specialising in compact objects such as neutron stars and black holes.

Career
Shapiro studied at Harvard University and graduated with a BSc. in 1969, completed his Master's degree in 1971 at Princeton, and completed his PhD in 1973. He became a professor in 1975 at Cornell University. In 1996 he became a professor of physics and astrophysics at University of Illinois at Urbana-Champaign. He is an expert in the numerical simulation of astrophysical phenomena in general relativity and has written two standard works on the subject.

In 1979 he was a Sloan Fellow and in 1989 became a Guggenheim Fellow. In 1998 he became a Fellow of the American Physical Society. 
In 2017, he received the Hans A. Bethe Prize for his seminal and sustained contributions to understanding physical processes in compact object astrophysics, and advancing numerical relativity.

Research 
His research concerns the physics of black holes and neutron stars, gravitational collapse and the development of black holes, gravitational waves from the inspiral of neutron stars and black holes in binary systems, the dynamics of large N-body, cosmological questions (big bang nucleosynthesis), and neutrino astrophysics. He has simulated the spectrum of the radiation that develops when gas from an accretion disk falls onto a black hole or neutron star and the destruction and swallowing up of stars by a supermassive black hole in the galaxy. Additionally, the collision and merging of black holes and the development of black holes in galaxies from a relativistic, shock-free gas and the collapse of an unstable relativistic cluster. He showed that toroidal black holes as a transient state in gravitational collapse can develop and that the possibility for the development of a naked singularity exists in the collision of shock-free matter from otherwise normal initial conditions, which violates the cosmic censorship hypothesis.

He has also worked on the detection of gravitational wave signals and their observation in gravitational wave detectors such as LIGO.

Personal life 

He has been married since 1971 and has a son and a daughter.

Publications (selection) 
 with Thomas W. Baumgarte: Numerical Relativity. Solving Einstein’s Equations on the Computer. Cambridge University Press, 2010. 
 with Saul A. Teukolsky: Black Holes, White Dwarfs, and Neutron Stars: The Physics of Compact Objects. Wiley, 1983. 
 
 editor with Teukolsky: Highlights of Modern Astrophysics. Concepts and Controversies. (Conference at Cornell University, 1984), Wiley, 1986. 
Shapiro, Teukolsky: Black Holes, Naked Singularities and the Violation of Cosmic Censorship, American Scientist, vol. 79, 1991, pp. 330–343 
Shapiro, Teukolsky: Formation of Naked Singularities: The Violation of Cosmic Censorship, Phys. Rev. Lett., vol. 66, 1991, pp. 994–997

References

External links
 Homepage at University of Illinois at Urbana-Champaign

1947 births
Living people
University of Illinois Urbana-Champaign faculty
Princeton University alumni
Harvard University alumni
Cornell University faculty
American astrophysicists
Sloan Research Fellows